The Best Man Wins is a 1935 American crime film directed by Erle C. Kenton and starring Edmund Lowe, Jack Holt and Bela Lugosi.

The film's sets were designed by the art director Lionel Banks.

Main cast
 Sam Flint as the doctor (uncredited)
 Forrester Harvey as Harry
 Jack Holt as Nick Roberts 
 Edmund Lowe as Toby Warren 
 Bela Lugosi as Doc Boehm 
 J. Farrell MacDonald as Captain—Harbor Patrol
 Florence Rice as Ann Barry

References

Bibliography
 Michael L. Stephens. Art Directors in Cinema: A Worldwide Biographical Dictionary. McFarland, 1998.

External links
 

1935 films
1935 crime films
American black-and-white films
American crime films
Films directed by Erle C. Kenton
Columbia Pictures films
1930s English-language films
1930s American films